Georgi Georgiyevich Aslanidi (born 11 August 1984) is a Russian former professional footballer.

Club career
He made his debut in the Russian Premier League in 2004 for FC Rostov.

References

1984 births
Sportspeople from Vladikavkaz
Living people
Russian footballers
FC Rostov players
FC SKA Rostov-on-Don players
FC Zvezda Irkutsk players
Russian Premier League players
FC Armavir players
Association football midfielders
FC Spartak Vladikavkaz players